= Vyscha Liga =

Vyscha Liga may refer to:

- Belarusian Premier League
- Bulgarian A Football Group
- Ukrainian Premier League
